Maniacal Miscreation is the debut album by the Scottish brutal death metal band Cerebral Bore. It was recorded in Foel Studios with producer Chris Fielding and released on 11 April 2011 through Earache Records. A music video for "Maniacal Miscreation", filmed at Upwood Military Base in Peterborough, U.K. with director Phil Berridge was released on 11 April 2011.

Track listing

Personnel
All information is derived from the enclosed booklet.
Cerebral Bore
Simone "Som" Pluijmers – vocals
Paul McGuire – guitars
Kyle Rutherford – bass guitar
Allan "McDibet" MacDonald – drums

Additional Musicians
 Angel Ochoa (of Cephalotripy & Disgorge) - guest vocals on "Maniacal Miscreation"

Production and artwork
Chris Fielding – production, engineering, mixing and mastering
Colin Mark - cover artwork
Tom Bradfield - layout
Sam Scott-Hunter - photography

References

2011 debut albums
Cerebral Bore albums